Melissa Hamilton (born 2 August 1989) is a Northern Irish ballet dancer and a First Soloist with the Royal Ballet, London.

Early life
Hamilton was born in Belfast and spent most of her childhood in Dromore, County Down. Her father is a builder and her mother is a pre-school teacher. Her sister is an architect and her brother is a primary school teacher. She started dancing at age four. She attended Dromore Primary School and Banbridge Academy, and left the latter after she finished her GCSEs. Until that point, the only training Hamilton had are once-a-week classes. At age 16, she was awarded a scholarship and entered Elmhurst Ballet School in Birmingham, where she trained for two years. During her first year, she was told she would not be able to catch up. However, in her second year, she was taught by Masha Mukhamedov (wife of Irek Mukhamedov), who believed she could have a career in dance. When Mukhamedovs moved to Athens, Hamilton followed them to train privately with Masha for 10 months.

Career

In 2007, at age 18, she competed at the Youth America Grand Prix to “test the water”, but ended up winning the competition. The YAGP prize is joining ABT II, American Ballet Theatre's second company. However, Hamilton did not want to move to New York, so Mukhamedov contacted Monica Mason, then artistic director of The Royal Ballet, to let her know Hamilton would send her a video of her dancing. Hamilton was invited to take classes with the company, and offered a contract to join the company as an Artist within a week after her victory at YAGP. She joined the company in 2007. The following year, despite being in the corps, she originated a role for Wayne McGregor's Infra, and has frequently collaborated with McGregor since. She was soon cast in Kenneth MacMillan's works such as Juliet in Romeo and Juliet, the title role in Manon and Mary Vetsera in Mayerling. She was named First Artist in 2009, Soloist the following year and First Soloist in 2013.

After Dresden Semperoper Ballett's Jiri Bubenicek suggested to have Hamilton partner him for his farewell performance in Manon, the directors of Royal Ballet and Semperoper Ballett negotiated and agreed to let Hamilton take a leave of absence to join Semperoper Ballett as a principal dancer. She danced with the company during the 2015/16 and 2016/17 seasons. During her tenure in Dresden, she made several principal role debuts, including Nikiya in La Bayadere, Princess Aurora in The Sleeping Beauty and Odette/Odile in Swan Lake. She returned to The Royal Ballet in the 2017/18 season.

Hamilton has also performed internationally, including Roberto Bolle's Italy tour and Mikhailovsky Ballet’s 85th anniversary in St Petersburg, partnering Bolle.

Writing of Hamilton's performance as Juliet in Kenneth MacMillan's Romeo and Juliet, The Observer's critic Luke Jennings wrote, "What really marks Hamilton out is the articulacy of her line. Here, she is all singing, expansive curves[…] And if her acting can seem understated, it's never less than natural. In Act 3, she signals her unravelling with an immense weariness, and its final moments with a slow, sad unfurling of her arms."

Selected repertoire
Hamilton's repertoire with The Royal Ballet and Semperoper Ballett includes:

The Royal Ballet
The title role in Manon
Juliet in Romeo and Juliet
Mary Vetsera in Mayerling
Sugar Plum Fairy in The Nutcracker
Queen of the Dryads in Don Quixote
Olga in Onegin
The Lilac Fairy and Princess Florine in The Sleeping Beauty
Terpsichore in Apollo
Bethana Waltz and Alaskan Rag in Elite Syncopations 
Symphonic Variations
‘Rubies’ from Jewels
Agon
Serenade
The Concert

The Judas Tree
Song of the Earth

Created roles by Wayne McGregor
Infra
Yugen
Woolf Works
Limen
Carbon Life
Human Seasons
Acis and Galatea

Semperoper Ballett
Nikiya in La Bayadere
Princess Aurora in The Sleeping Beauty
Odette/Odile in Swan Lake
The title role in Manon

Personal life
Hamilton is married to Michael Christou, a property developer, interior designer and cofounder of a property development company called 1.61 London.

Awards and other achievements
Outstanding Female Performance (Classical) at the 2009 Critics’ Circle National Dance Awards, 2011
Gold medal in the Eighth International Seoul Ballet Competition, 2011
Allianz Arts and Cultural Brand Ambassador for Northern Ireland, 2013

References

Irish ballerinas
Dancers of The Royal Ballet
1989 births
Living people
People educated at the Elmhurst School for Dance
21st-century ballet dancers
Expatriates from Northern Ireland in Greece
Expatriates from Northern Ireland in Germany
People from County Down